'Stella Tjazuko !Naruses, stage name Stella, is a Namibian musician. She was born as Stella Kavendjii in Omaruru, Namibia and raised in the township of Mondesa, Swakopmund. Stella sings in her native Otjiherero and is best known for her 2004 hit song Kapepo.

Born on 25 July in Omaruru and influenced by late South African songstress Brenda Fassie and country music legend; Dolly Parton, stella set her heart on music. She joined her high school choir and also took part in local music talent shows. While participating in the popular national Tafel Lager Open Mic competition, she was approached by her friend, long time producer, and later husband, Steven !Naruseb, with an idea of helping her to release her own album. She was later introduced to Phura, another artist and the two started performing together.

She released her debut album, titled "Kapepo" in April 2004, which received media exposure with substantial public response and making title track; Kapepo an "instant anthem". With the album she won the best afro-pop category of the 2004 Sanlam/NBC Music Awards, followed by an acclaimed nomination in the Best Female Artist: Southern African category of the 2005 Kora African Awards.

In 2006, she returned with her 2nd album “Okurama Kwe Temba" under the stewardship of Steven !Naruseb. In the same year, she recorded  songs with Allan Auriant, 2005 Kora African Award winner of the Best Male Artist. In addition, the Nelson Mandela Centre for African Culture, a parastatal body operating under the aegis of the Ministry of Arts and Culture in Mauritius (and whose core objective is to preserve and promote African culture in Mauritius), invited her to be the guest artist during the country’s African Day Celebrations. 

The acclaim of “Okurama Kwe Temba” pulled through 2007 and the title track earned her a nomination in the Best Afro-pop category of the December 2007 Sanlam NBC Music Awards. And again the same album earned her two nominations in the Ongwediva Namibian music awards 3 May 2008 in the categories of Best People’s choice and Best Oviritje.

Her third album titled "Uaripi” was dropped on 5 December 2008. Stella released her Fifth album titled Motherless Child on the fifth of Nov 2012. This album was recorded at Welwitschia Music Production by Steven !Naruseb. The album earned her four nominations in the NAMA music awards 2013 (Best Female artist of the year, Best Oviritje, Best damara punch and Best gospel). She collaborated two tracks with Apostle Jimmy from Malawi one of the song won an award in the NAMA 2014.

References 

21st-century Namibian women singers
Living people
People from Omaruru
Year of birth missing (living people)
People from Swakopmund